Ronald James William Crawford Lindsay (born 18 November 1937), known professionally as Jimmy Crawford, is an English pop music singer. He is best known for his cover version of "I Love How You Love Me" (1961).

Life and career
Crawford was born in Sheffield, Yorkshire, England. He was educated at the Central Technical School in Sheffield, and later worked as a draughtsman at Davy United. Crawford was a competition swimmer, after learning to overcome his fear of the water during his spell of National service in the Army. Crawford was a contemporary of fellow Sheffield-born singer, Dave Berry.

He formed his first band, Ron Lindsay and the Coasters, and played in local clubs, but found chart success as a solo artist. Signed to a recording contract with Columbia, he released "Love or Money" in June 1961. It spent one week at No. 49 in the UK Singles Chart. His second release garnered his biggest hit. Crawford's cover version of the American hit, "I Love How You Love Me", had originally been recorded by The Paris Sisters. Crawford's effort peaked at No. 18 in November the same year, spending a total of ten weeks in the UK listings. His third single, "I Shoulda Listened to Mama" was released in May 1962, but failed to reach the chart.

In 1962, Crawford sang "Take It Easy" and appeared in the film, Play It Cool, also starring Billy Fury and Shane Fenton.

He formed Jimmy Crawford and the Ravens, quickly followed by Jimmy Crawford and the Messengers in early 1963. He later joined forces with Jim Ryder to perform as Jimmy Crawford with the Chantelles.  Over the years his backing band was variously known as The Jimmy Crawford Four and The Jimmy Crawford Blend. Crawford toured Australia for six months in 1977, with Jim Ryder (guitar), Gary Lawson (keyboards) and Barry Page (drums).

He and his wife Maureen were involved in a serious traffic collision in March 2005, although both eventually recovered from the ordeal.

Other versions and appearances
Crawford's recording of "Love or Money", which was produced by Frank Barber (who also produced Ricky Valance's "Tell Laura I Love Her"), appeared on the 1961 British Hit Parade, Pt. 2: April–September compilation album, along with another version by The Blackwells.

"I Love How You Love Me" was also a UK chart hit for Maureen Evans in 1964 reaching No. 34, and for Paul and Barry Ryan in 1966 at No. 21. However, Crawford's own version has appeared on many compilation albums in the ensuing years, and numerous on-line marital and romance firms have used his version.

Confusion
He is not to be confused with the American jazz drummer, Jimmy Crawford.

See also
List of Columbia Graphophone Company artists

Discography

Chart singles

References

External links

1937 births
Living people
English male singers
English pop singers
Musicians from Sheffield